Guillaume Thevenot (born 13 September 1993 in La Garenne-Colombes) is a French cyclist riding for the CC Nogent-sur-Oise amateur team in France.

Major results

2011
 2nd Chrono des Nations Juniors
2013
 3rd National Under-23 Road Race Championships
 7th Polynormande
2014
 1st Stage 4 (TTT) Ronde de l'Isard
 3rd National Under-23 Road Race Championships

References

External links

 
 

People from La Garenne-Colombes
1993 births
Living people
French male cyclists
Sportspeople from Hauts-de-Seine
Cyclists from Île-de-France